The Trabzon Football League was founded as a regional football league for Trabzon based clubs in 1922. In the period from 1924 to 1935, the winners of the Trabzon League qualified for the former Turkish Football Championship. In the following period from 1940 to 1951, the Trabzon league champions qualified for the qualifying stages of the national championship. The city of Trabzon was home to a major rivalry between local clubs İdman Ocağı and İdman Gücü, who fought for the championship title in numerous seasons. The rivalry and relationship between those two teams has been often compared to that of the renowned Intercontinental Derby in Turkey.

After the introduction of the professional nationwide league in 1959, the league lost its first level status. Trabzon İdman Ocağı are the most successful club in the history of the league, holding the record with 12 championship titles.

Participated teams
The following teams participated in the league regularly for at least a few years: 
 Trabzon İdman Ocağı
 Trabzon İdman Gücü
 Trabzon İdman Grubu
 Trabzon Lisesi
 Muallim Mektebi
 Necm-i Ati
 Yıldızspor
 Trabzon Ticaret Lisesi
 Martıspor
 Karadeniz Gücü
 Yolspor
 Trabzon İdman Yurdu
 Garnizon İdman Yurdu
 Pulathane Sebat

Champions

Performance by club

References
 
 

Defunct football leagues in Turkey
Sport in Trabzon
Sports leagues established in 1922
1922 establishments in the Ottoman Empire